Aaron Douglas Smith (born April 19, 1976) is a former American football defensive end for the Pittsburgh Steelers of the National Football League (NFL). He was drafted in the fourth round of the 1999 NFL Draft by the Steelers and played for the team for thirteen seasons. He played college football for the University of Northern Colorado.

Professional career

Pittsburgh Steelers
Smith was drafted by the Pittsburgh Steelers in the 4th round, 109th pick overall, of the 1999 NFL draft. Smith played in every Steelers' game at left defensive end from 2000 through 2006. Smith has been considered an ideal defensive end in Pittsburgh's 3-4 defense. Smith won a Super Bowl ring with the Steelers in Super Bowl XL, during the 2005 season. He recorded four tackles throughout the game.  After the 2008 season, Smith won another ring with the Steelers in Super Bowl XLIII.

On February 27, 2007, the Steelers resigned Smith to a 5-year, US$25 million contract. Through the 2007 season, Smith ranks ninth all-time on the Steelers sacks list. After missing parts of three games with a knee injury early in the 2007 season, Smith missed the last four games due to a torn biceps muscle  while playing against the New England Patriots in early December. Smith made a full recovery from the injury and returned to his starting position in 2008, recording 44 tackles and 5.5 sacks.

In 2009, Smith played in Pittsburgh's first five games before sustaining a torn rotator cuff in an Oct 10 win over the Detroit Lions. On Oct 14, the Steelers placed Smith on the injured reserve list, ending his 2009 season. He was hurt again in 2010, playing in only 6 games, replaced by Ziggy Hood.  In 2011, he played in 4 games before being placed on the injured reserve list for a neck injury, marking the third time in three years that he had been placed on the injured reserve list. He was released on March 2, 2012.

On August 3, 2012, during a ceremony in Latrobe, PA, Smith officially retired from the NFL.

In 2017, Smith served as an assistant football & basketball coach at North Allegheny Senior High School in Wexford, Pennsylvania.

Personal life
Smith has three brothers named David, Stephan, and Kevin.

Smith and his wife Jaimie have five children: daughters Elliana, Elysia, and Emilia and sons Ezekiel and Elijiah. His son Elijiah suffered from acute lymphoblastic leukemia but completed his treatments successfully and is now cancer-free.

Smith was a consensus All-State selection at Sierra High School (Colorado Springs, Colo.), he also lettered in basketball and was a two-time All-Conference choice in both sports.

References

External links 
Aaron Smith  at NFL.com
Aaron Smith biography at Steelers.com 

1976 births
Living people
American Conference Pro Bowl players
American football defensive ends
Northern Colorado Bears football players
Pittsburgh Steelers players
Players of American football from Colorado Springs, Colorado
Ed Block Courage Award recipients